The Elbridge Gerry House is a historic house at 44 Washington Street in Marblehead, Massachusetts.  Local lore holds that this house is a c. 1730 house that was the home of merchant Thomas Gerry, and the place where statesman and Founding Father Elbridge Gerry was born in 1744.  Stylistic analysis of the house, however, suggests that it is instead a late Georgian or early Federalist construction dating to c. 1790.

The house listed on the National Register of Historic Places in 1973, and included in the Marblehead Historic District in 1984.

See also
Elbridge Gerry Mansion, a chateau in Manhattan built in 1895 for Elbridge's grandson
National Register of Historic Places listings in Essex County, Massachusetts

References

Houses in Marblehead, Massachusetts
Houses on the National Register of Historic Places in Essex County, Massachusetts
Individually listed contributing properties to historic districts on the National Register in Massachusetts
Homes of United States Founding Fathers